This is a list of electoral results for the North Eastern Province in Victorian state elections.

Members for North Eastern Province

Election results

Elections in the 2000s

Elections in the 1990s

Elections in the 1980s

 This by-election was caused by the resignation of Bill Baxter, who unsuccessfully contested the 1984 federal election for the Division of Indi. Baxter returned to state politics to re-contest his seat at the by-election.

Elections in the 1970s

 This by-election was caused by the resignation of Keith Bradbury.

 Two party preferred vote was estimated.

|- style="background-color:#E9E9E9"
! colspan="6" style="text-align:left;" |After distribution of preferences

Elections in the 1960s

 Preferences were not distributed.

 Preferences were not distributed.

Elections in the 1950s

References

Victoria (Australia) state electoral results by district